Baltos lankos (literally: White Plains originating from a popular folk riddle White Plains, black sheep), founded in 1992, is a Lithuania-based publishing house specializing in the humanities and literature. It is one of Lithuania's best-known publishers, and has printed the works of Tomas Venclova and Jonas Mekas, along with its own periodical. Baltos lankos is responsible for publishing multi volume History of Lithuania.

References
  Official website
  World Press Review

Publishing companies established in 1992
Book publishing companies of Lithuania
1992 establishments in Lithuania